Roshni-chu (Röşni-Çu) is a rural locality (a selo) in Urus-Martanovsky District of the Chechen Republic, Russia, located about  southwest of Grozny.  Population:  

On August 14, 2005, a militant group attacked the village and five officials from the regional military head of Urus-Martanovsky District and Colonel Alexander Kayak were killed and one person was seriously wounded.

References

Rural localities in Urus-Martanovsky District